Season 2002–03 was the 119th football season in which Dumbarton competed at a Scottish national level, entering the Scottish Football League for the 97th time, the Scottish Cup for the 108th time, the Scottish League Cup for the 56th time and the Scottish Challenge Cup for the 12th time.

Overview 
Season 2002-03 began with yet another new manager at the helm.  Following the success of promotion the season before, Tom Carson had fallen out with the board and left the club, to be replaced by David Winnie.  The league campaign, as was so often the case with Dumbarton, started well and then fell away.  By March there were some concerns of a return to Division 3, resulting in David Winnie's departure as manager.  Fortunately his replacement Brian Fairlie had the desired effect and a final unbeaten 7 game run ensured a creditable 6th place.

In the Scottish Cup, for the second year running, it would be a first round exit, this time to Raith Rovers.

In the League Cup, Inverness Caledonian Thistle were to prove too much to handle in the first round.

Finally, in the Scottish Challenge Cup, it was a case of 'role reversal'.  In the competition which had seen just one win in ten attempts, this season would see a mini cup run before Queen of the South would bring it to an end in the third round.

Locally, in the Stirlingshire Cup, Dumbarton played just one group tie, losing to Falkirk on penalties after a drawn game.

Results & fixtures

Scottish Second Division

Bell's Challenge Cup

CIS League Cup

Tennent's Scottish Cup

Stirlingshire Cup

Pre-season and Other Matches

League table

Player statistics

Squad 

|}

Transfers

Players in

Players out

Trivia
 The League match against Raith Rovers on 17 August marked John Dillon's 100th appearance for Dumbarton in all national competitions - the 123rd Dumbarton player to reach this milestone.
 The League Cup match against Inverness Caledonian Thistle on 10 September marked Michael Dickie's and Dave Stewart's 100th appearances for Dumbarton in all national competitions - the 124th and 125th Dumbarton players respectively to reach this milestone.
 The League match against Raith Rovers on 1 March marked Steven Bonar's 100th appearance for Dumbarton in all national competitions - the 126th Dumbarton player to reach this milestone.

See also
 2002–03 in Scottish football

References

External links
John Wight (Dumbarton Football Club Historical Archive) 
Scottish Football Historical Archive

Dumbarton F.C. seasons
Scottish football clubs 2002–03 season